Agnes de Castro is a 1695 tragedy by the English writer Catharine Trotter. Based on the novel of the same title by Aphra Behn, it was first staged by John Rich's company at the Theatre Royal, Drury Lane.

The original Drury Lane cast included Thomas Simpson as King, George Powell as Prince, John Verbruggen as  Alvaro, Colley Cibber as Lorenzo, John Mills as Pedro, Jane Rogers as Agnes de Castro, Mary Kent as Bianca and Frances Maria Knight as Elvira. The prologue was written by William Wycherley. The published version was dedicated to the Duke of Dorset.

References

Bibliography
 Van Lennep, W. The London Stage, 1660-1800: Volume One, 1660-1700. Southern Illinois University Press, 1960.

1695 plays
West End plays
Tragedy plays
Plays by Catharine Trotter Cockburn